Zosis geniculata sometimes referred to as the humped spider or grey house spider, is a cosmopolitan species with a pantropical distribution. In Australia, it is often seen in buildings near human habitation.

References

Uloboridae
Spiders described in 1789
Pantropical spiders